Meco Plays The Wizard of Oz is a studio album that was released in 1978. The album sold around 400,000 copies.

Track listing
"Over the Rainbow" (Harold Arlen, E.Y. "Yip" Harburg) - (1:58)
"Cyclone" (George Bassman, Herbert Stohart, George Stoll) - (3:43)
"Munchkinland" - (1:19)
"Ding-Dong! The Witch Is Dead" (Harold Arlen, E.Y. "Yip" Harburg) - (2:00)
"We're Off to See the Wizard" (Harold Arlen, E.Y. "Yip" Harburg) - (3:32)
"The Haunted Forest" (Harold Arlen, E.Y. "Yip" Harburg) - (1:22)
"March of the Winkies" (Herbert Stohart) - (1:20)
"Dorothy's Rescue" (Herbert Stohart) - (1:11)
"If I Were King of the Forest" (Harold Arlen, E.Y. "Yip" Harburg) - (0:57)
"The Reprise: Delirious Escape/Over The Rainbow/Ding-Dong! The Witch Is Dead/Munchkinland" (Harold Arlen, E.Y. "Yip" Harburg) - (3:17)
"Delirious Escape" (George Bassman, Herbert Stohart, George Stoll)
"Munchkinland" (Harold Arlen, E.Y. "Yip" Harburg)

Charts

Album

Singles

See also
 The Wizard of Oz, 1939 film

References

External links
Discogs link

1978 albums
Casablanca Records albums
Meco albums
Albums produced by Tony Bongiovi
Albums produced by Harold Wheeler (musician)
The Wizard of Oz (1939 film)